Neustadt/Harz is a village and a former municipality in the district of Nordhausen, in Thuringia, Germany. Since July 2018, it is part of the municipality Harztor.

Culture and places of interest
The area around Neustadt is rich in places of interest, which are all accessible on footpaths. Of the three castle ruins Hohnstein Castle, the oldest in the entire Harz, is the most significant. Six kilometers from the village is the recently renovated and protected monument of the Neustadt Reservoir (also often called the Nordhausen Reservoir). There is also the Gondelteich lake and a separate forest swimming pool. Nearby is the hill known as the Poppenberg, where the High Harz begins.

Gallery

References

Former municipalities in Thuringia
Villages in the Harz
Nordhausen (district)